Schinia ultima is a moth of the family Noctuidae. It is found in North America, including Colorado, Kansas, Nebraska, Oklahoma, Missouri and Texas.

The wingspan is about 23 mm.

External links
Images

Schinia
Moths of North America
Moths described in 1876